The 1939 World Professional Basketball Tournament was the first edition of the World Professional Basketball Tournament. It was held in Chicago, Illinois, during the days of 26-28 March 1939 and featured 11 teams competing for a prize money of $10,000. It was won by the New York Rens who defeated the Oshkosh All-Stars 34–25 in the title game. The Harlem Globetrotters came in third after beating the Sheboygan Redskins 36–33 in the third-place game. Puggy Bell of the New York Rens was named the tournaments Most Valuable Player.

Results

First round
26 March - Harlem Globetrotters 41, Fort Wayne Harvesters 33
26 March - New York Yankees 40, Brenton Harbor House of David 32
26 March - Sheboygan Redskins 47, Illinois Grads 29
26 March - Oshkosh All-Stars 40, Clarksburg Oil 33

Bracket

Third place game

Championship game

Individual awards

All-Tournament First team
C - Leroy Edwards, Indianapolis Kautskys
F - Ed Dancker, Sheboygan Redskins 
F - Puggy Bell, New York Rens (MVP)
G - Babe Pressley, Harlem Globetrotters
G - Zack Clayton, New York Rens

References

External links
WPBT 1939-48 on apbr.org

World Professional Basketball Tournament